The Diocese of Blackburn is a Church of England diocese, covering much of Lancashire, created on 12 November 1926 from part of the Diocese of Manchester. The diocese includes the towns of Blackburn, Blackpool and Burnley, the cities of Lancaster and Preston, as well as a large part of the Ribble Valley. The cathedral is Blackburn Cathedral. The See is currently vacant following the retirement of Julian Henderson.

The diocesan retreat and conference centre is located at Whalley Abbey in the Ribble Valley, alongside the ruins of the 14th-century Cistercian monastery, dissolved in 1537. The abbey was in private possession until 1923 and has been in the possession of the Diocese of Blackburn since 1926.

Bishops
Alongside the diocesan Bishop of Blackburn, the diocese has two suffragan bishops: Jill Duff, Bishop suffragan of Lancaster, consecrated in 2018; and Philip North, Bishop suffragan of Burnley, appointed in 2015.

Since 1994, Michael Vickers, retired area Bishop of Colchester, has been licensed to serve as an honorary assistant bishop in the diocese. He lives in Scotforth, Lancaster. 
Cyril Ashton, a retired former Bishop suffragan of Doncaster has been licensed since his 2011 retirement to Lancaster. 
Retired former archbishop of York David Hope lives in Hellifield, N. Yorks (in the neighbouring Diocese of Leeds) and is licensed as an honorary assistant bishop in Blackburn diocese.

Alternative episcopal oversight (for parishes in the diocese which reject the ministry of priests who are women) is provided by Philip North, Bishop suffragan of Burnley.

Archdeaconries and deaneries

Churches within the diocese

Deanery of Accrington 
Area Dean: the Revd Canon David Arnold

 Christ Church, Accrington
 St Andrew, Accrington
 St Mary Magdalen, Accrington
 St Peter, Accrington
 St James, Accrington
 St Paul, Accrington
 St John the Evangelist, Accrington
 St James, Altham
 St John the Baptist, Baxenden
 All Saints, Clayton-le-Moors
 St Clement, Green Haworth
 St James, Haslingden
 St Augustine, Huncoat
 St Peter, Laneside, Haslingden
 St Thomas, Musbury, Haslingden
 All Saints, Oswaldtwistle
 Immanuel, Oswaldtwistle
 St Paul, Oswaldtwistle

Deanery of Blackburn with Darwen 
Area Dean: the Revd Canon Andrew Horsfall

 Blackburn Cathedral
 Christ Church, Blackburn
 Holy Trinity, Blackburn
 St Aidan, Mill Hill, Blackburn
 St Andrew, Livesey, Blackburn
 St Barnabas, Blackburn
 St Bartholomew, Ewood, Blackburn
 St Francis, Feniscliffe, Blackburn
 St Gabriel, Brownhill Drive, Blackburn
 St James, Blackburn
 St Jude, Blackburn
 St Luke, Blackburn
 St Michael & All Angels, Blackburn
 St Silas, Blackburn
 St Stephen, Blackburn
 Church of the Saviour, Blackburn
 St Barnabas, Darwen
 St Cuthbert, Darwen
 St Mary, Grimehills, Darwen
 St Peter, Darwen
 Immanuel, Feniscowles
 St Paul, Hoddlesden
 St Oswald, Knuzden
 St James, Lower Darwen
 St James, Over Darwen
 St Stephen, Tockholes

Deanery of Burnley 
Area Dean: the Revd Munawar Din

 St James, Briercliffe
 All Saints, Habergham, Burnley
 St Andrew, Burnley
 St Catherine, Burnley
 St Cuthbert, Burnley
 St Mark, Burnley
 St Matthew the Apostle, Habergham Eaves, Burnley
 St Peter, Burnley
 St Stephen, Burnley
 Wellfield Mission, Burnley
 St Margaret, Hapton
 St John the Divine, Holme-in-Cliviger
 St Leonard, Padiham
 St John the Evangelist, Worsthorne

Deanery of Chorley 
Area Dean: the Revd Neil Kelley

 St Paul, Adlington
 All Saints, Appley Bridge
 St John the Baptist, Bretherton
 St James, Brindle
 Christ Church, Charnock Richard
 All Saints, Chorley
 St George, Chorley
 St James, Chorley
 St Laurence, Chorley
 St Peter, Chorley
 Clayton Brook Community Church
 Coppull Parish Church
 St John the Divine, Coppull
 St Michael & All Angels, Croston
 St Mary the Virgin, Eccleston
 Euxton Parish Church
 St Barnabas, Heapey
 St Peter, Mawdesley
 Christ Church, Parbold
 St Anne, Shevington
 St Wilfrid, Standish
 St John the Evangelist, Whittle-le-Woods
 St Paul, Withnell
 St James the Great, Wrightington

Deanery of Leyland 
Area Dean: the Revd Marc Wolverson

 St Aidan, Bamber Bridge
 Buckshaw Village Church (ecumenical)
St Saviour, Cuerden
 St Paul, Farington Moss
 All Saints, Hesketh
 All Saints, Higher Walton
 Holy Trinity, Hoghton
 St Michael & All Angels, Hoole
 St Ambrose, Leyland
 St Andrew, Leyland
 St James, Leyland
 St John, Leyland
 St Andrew, Longton
 All Saints, New Longton
 St James, Lostock Hall
 St Leonard, Penwortham
 St Mary, Penwortham
 St Mary the Virgin, Rufford
 Holy Trinity, Tarleton
 St Leonard, Walton-le-Dale

Deanery of Pendle 
Area Dean: the Revd Lesley Hinchcliffe

 St Thomas, Barrowford
 St Luke the Evangelist, Brierfield
 St Bartholomew, Colne
 Christ Church, Colne
 Holy Trinity, Colne
 St Anne, Fence-in-Pendle
 St Michael & All Angels, Foulridge
 St John the Evangelist, Higham
 St Mary, Nelson
 St John the Evangelist, Great Marsden, Nelson
 St Paul, Little Marsden, Nelson
 St Mary, Newchurch in Pendle
 St Mary the Virgin, Trawden

Deanery of Whalley 
Area Dean: the Revd Jonathan Carmylie

 St Leonard, Balderstone
 SS Peter & Paul, Bolton-by-Bowland
 Christ Church, Chatburn
 St Bartholomew, Chipping
 St James, Clitheroe
 St Mary Magdalene, Clitheroe
 St Paul, Low Moor, Clitheroe
 St Leonard, Downham
 St Mary the Virgin, Gisburn
 St Bartholomew, Great Harwood
All Hallows, Great Mitton
 St Ambrose, Grindleton
 St Nicholas, Heyhouses
 St John the Evangelist, Hurst Green
St Leonard, Langho
 St Mary, Mellor
 All Saints, Pendleton
 St John the Evangelist, Read
 St Wilfrid, Ribchester
 SS Peter & Paul, Rishton
 St Peter, Salesbury
 St Leonard the Less, Samlesbury
 St Peter, Simonstone
 St Saviour, Stydd
 St Helen, Waddington
 St Catherine, West Bradford
 St Mary & All Saints, Whalley
 St Michael, Whitewell

Deanery of Blackpool 
Area Dean: the Revd Peter Lillicrap

 All Saints, Anchorsholme
 All Hallows, Bispham
 Christ Church with All Saints (Beacon Church), Blackpool
 Holy Cross, South Shore, Blackpool
 Holy Trinity, South Shore, Blackpool
 St Christopher, Hawes Side, Blackpool
 St John, Blackpool
 St Mark, Layton, Blackpool
 St Mary, South Shore, Blackpool
 St Paul, Marton, Blackpool
 St Paul, North Shore, Blackpool
 St Peter, South Shore, Blackpool
 St Stephen-on-the-Cliffs, Blackpool
 St Thomas, Blackpool
 St Wilfrid (Freedom Church), Mereside, Blackpool
 St Anne, Greenlands
 St Luke's Mission Church, Staining

Deanery of Garstang 
Area Dean: the Revd Andrew Wilkinson

 All Saints, Barnacre
 St Lawrence, Barton
 St Hilda, Bilsborrow
 St Eadmor, Bleasdale
 Calder Vale Mission Church
 St John the Evangelist, Calder Vale
 St Helen, Churchtown
 St Anne, Copp
 St Mark, Eagland Hill
 St Thomas, Garstang
 St Mary the Virgin, Goosnargh
 Blessed Virgin Mary, Hambleton
 St Peter, Inskip
 St John the Evangelist, Out Radcliffe
 St John the Baptist, Pilling
 St Oswald, Preesall
 St Michael, St Michael's on Wyre
 St Peter, Scorton
 St James, Stalmine
 St James, Whitechapel
 St Anne, Woodplumpton

Deanery of Kirkham 
Area Dean: the Revd Anne Beverley

 St Matthew, Ballam
 St John the Evangelist, Clifton
 Holy Trinity, Freckleton
 St Michael, Kirkham
 St Cuthbert, Lytham
 St John the Divine, Lytham
 St Anne, Lytham St Annes
 St Margaret of Antioch, Lytham St Annes
 St Paul, Ansdell & Fairhaven, Lytham St Annes
 St Thomas, Lytham St Annes
 Christ Church, Treales
 St Paul, Warton
 St Michael, Weeton
 Christ Church, Wesham
 St Nicholas, Wrea Green

Deanery of Lancaster and Morecambe 
Area Dean: vacant

 St Michael & All Angels, Cockerham
 St Mark, Dolphinholme
 St John the Evangelist, Ellel
 St James, Forton
 Christ Church, Glasson
 St James, Heysham
 St Peter, Heysham
 Christ Church, Lancaster
 St Chad, Skerton, Lancaster
 St George, Marsh, Lancaster
 St Luke, Skerton, Lancaster
 St Mary the Virgin, Lancaster (Lancaster Priory)
 St Thomas, Lancaster
 Ascension, Torrisholme, Morecambe
 Holy Trinity, Morecambe
 St Barnabas, Morecambe
 St Christopher, Bare, Morecambe
 St John the Divine, Sandylands, Morecambe
 St Martin of Tours, Westgate, Morecambe
 Christ Church, Over Wyresdale
 St Helen, Overton
 St Peter, Quernmore
 St Paul, Scotforth
 Sunderland Point Mission Church
 St Luke, Winmarleigh

Deanery of Poulton 
Area Dean: the Revd Jane Atkinson

 St Andrew, Cleveleys
 St Nicholas, Fleetwood
 St Peter, Fleetwood
 St John the Evangelist, Little Thornton
 St Chad's Church, Poulton-le-Fylde
 St Hilda of Whitby, Poulton-le-Fylde
 St Anne, Singleton
 Christ Church, Thornton-le-Fylde

Deanery of Preston 
Area Dean: the Revd David Hanson

 St John the Baptist, Broughton
 St Michael, Grimsargh
 St Lawrence, Longridge
 St Paul, Longridge
 All Saints, Preston
 Ascension, Ribbleton, Preston
 Christ Church, Fulwood, Preston
 Christ the King Chapel, Preston
 Emmanuel, Preston
 St Andrew, Ashton-on-Ribble, Preston
 St Christopher, Lea, Preston
 St Cuthbert, Preston
 St George, Preston
 St James, Preston
 Minster of St John the Evangelist, Preston
 St Margaret, Ingol, Preston
 St Martin, Fulwood, Preston
 St Mary Magdalene, Ribbleton, Preston
 St Matthew, Preston
 St Michael & All Angels, Ashton-on-Ribble, Preston
 St Peter, Fulwood, Preston
 St Stephen, Preston

Deanery of Tunstall 
Area Dean: vacant

 St John the Baptist, Arkholme
 St Saviour, Aughton
 Holy Trinity, Bolton-le-Sands
 St Mary, Borwick
 St Paul, Brookhouse
 Christ Church, Carnforth
 St John the Evangelist, Gressingham
 St Wilfrid, Halton
 St Margaret, Hornby
 St Peter, Leck
 St Wilfrid, Melling
 St Mark, Nether Kellet
 St Cuthbert, Over Kellet
 St John, Silverdale
 St Luke, Slyne
 St James the Less, Tatham
 Good Shepherd, Tatham Fells
 St John the Baptist, Tunstall
 St Oswald, Warton
 St Michael the Archangel, Whittington
 Holy Trinity, Wray
 St John the Evangelist, Yealand Conyers

Disused churches 
This list is not exhaustive.
 St Mark's, Blackburn
St John's, Great Harwood

References
Church of England Statistics 2002

External links

 
Christian organizations established in 1926
Dioceses established in the 20th century
Blackburn